Ahmad Maher may refer to:
Ahmad Mahir Pasha (1888–1945), former Prime Minister of Egypt
Ahmad Maher (diplomat) (1935–2010), grandson of Ahmad Mahir Pasha and former Foreign Minister of Egypt
Ahmad Maher (director), Egyptian film director
Ahmad Maher (footballer) (born 1990), Egyptian football player
Ahmad Maher Wridat (born 1991), Palestinian football player
Ahmed Maher (youth leader) (born 1980), co-founder of the April 6 Movement in Egypt